The Path to the Nest of Spiders is a 1947 novel by the Italian writer Italo Calvino. The narrative is a coming-of-age story, set against the backdrop of World War II. It was Calvino's first novel.

Plot
Pin, an orphaned cobbler's apprentice in a town on the Ligurian coast, lives with his sister, a prostitute and spends as much time as he can at a seedy bar where he amuses the adult patrons. After stealing a pistol from a Nazi sailor, Pin searches for an identity with an Italian partisan group. All the while, the people he meets mock him without his knowing. The title refers to Pin's secret hiding place, directions to which he touts as a prize to any adults who win his trust.

Reception
Some critics view the work as unexceptional, on the grounds that it fails to address the issues other than from a very naive perspective; others credit it with being skillfully written 
and make a virtue of its portrayal of the complex emotions and politics of adults, as seen through the eyes of a child. However one passage about prisoners-of-war being made to dig their own grave before being shot is universally regarded as impressive.

References

See also
 1947 in literature
 Italian literature

1947 novels
Novels by Italo Calvino
Novels about orphans
Novels set in Liguria
20th-century Italian novels
1947 debut novels